The old man lost his horse (but it all turned out for the best) (also Bad luck? Good luck? Who knows? or Bad luck brings good luck - and good luck brings bad luck are some of the many titles given to one of the most famous parables from the Huainanzi (Chinese 淮南子, English Master of Huainan), chapter 18 (Chinese 人間訓, Renjianxun, English In the World of Man) dating to the 2nd century B.C. The story exemplifies the view of Taoism regarding "fortune" ("good luck") and "misfortune" ("bad luck").

The story is well-known throughout the East Asian cultural sphere and is often invoked to express the idea of "silver lining" or "blessing in disguise" in Chinese, Vietnamese, Korean, and Japanese.

In Western literature the parable was modified and is frequently used in philosophical or religious texts or in books dealing with management or psychological strategies.

Translation 
The English text is based on the translation by Claude Larre et al. Les grands traités du Huainan zi, 1993, p. 208–209.

Plot and statement 

The parable tells the story of a farmer who lives with his father close to the border to the barbarian territories. Without his fault and without being able to influence them, the farmer goes through various situations which all have important consequences for him:

 His horse, a considerable part of his property and livelihood, runs away.
 After weeks, his horse finds its way back and brings along other horses from the barbarian territories, thus increasing the farmer's property.
 Trying to ride one of the wild horses, the farmer falls and breaks his leg - which reduces his physical capacities.
 When the barbarians attack the borderland, the injured farmer is not drafted and does not have to join the battle to help with the defense - whereby he and his father survive and escape death.

These events are spontaneously judged by the neighbors, but the farmer's old father relativizes these judgments of the situations with his knowledge of Dào (i.e. The Right Way):
Everything is an interplay of Yin and Yang, of light and shadow, of happiness and unhappiness, whether in the smallest details or in the great events of life. But since in the framework of human perception it is impossible to recognize the future consequences of an event (and thus to know what is really 'good luck' or 'bad luck'), the old man's reaction to these events is a stoic equanimity, and thus the appropriate reaction. He reacts with wu wei (i.e. 'not intervening', 'not acting') but this term should not be confused with apathy. In this knowledge he finds his calm and lasting, true happiness: he accepts life as it is.

The wisdom in the parable does not come from a teacher, a monk or a king, and it is not discussed at length. It comes from a simple, old man who shows this wisdom in very short sentences - repetitions, since there is nothing to add. This indicates that the knowledge of Dào is accessible to everyone.

Through the introductory and concluding sentences it is made clear that the parable shows only a small part of an infinite sequence: before the loss of the horse there were other lucky/unlucky situations and after fending off the barbarians, there will be others. E.g. the farmer can't use his injured leg properly and will depend on his old father to help and support him – and so on.

Potential origin, chengyu, proverbs, and delimitations 

A similar sentiment to the parable is expressed in chapter 58 of the Tao Te Ching by Laozi from the 6th to 4th century BC, namely, Misery is what happiness rests upon. Happiness is what misery lurks beneath. Who knows where it ends?

The first known version of the story is found in the Huainanzi, which was compiled around 139 BCE.

Among chengyu, traditional Chinese idiomatic expressions, one finds the saying
 
 Sài wēng shī mǎ, yān zhī fēi fú
 The old man lost his horse, but it all turned out for the best.
The meaning is How could one know that it is not good fortune?

Short versions
 

Long versions

Western parallels – not referring to the parable – can be found in the following proverbs
 A blessing in disguise
 Bad luck often brings good luck.
 Every cloud has a silver lining.
 Every ill-luck is good for something in a wise man's hand.
 Every medal has its dark side.
 Every tide has its ebb.
 No great loss without some small gain
 Nothing is so bad in which there is not something good.

It must be noted, however, that in most of these proverbs the hopeful perspective points 'in the direction of good luck'.

More neutral is the statement of Hamlet in conversation with Rosenkranz:
 ..., for there is nothing either good or bad, but thinking makes it so.

Reception 
Starting from the original parable, different versions of the story have been written, which are described in books and on the internet under titles such as The Taoist Farmer, The Farmer and his Horse, The Father, His Son and the Horse, The Old Man Loses a Horse, etc. The story is mostly cited in philosophical or religious texts and management or psychology advisors. 

While in the original version the son loses his horse and the father comments, in recent (Western) versions a more direct view is found: The father himself is the horse's owner and directly comments on his situation. Most of these versions are longer and dramatically embellished, but the brevity and conciseness of the original text has the advantage of a simpler insight.

 Alan Watts told this story during talks about Eastern Wisdom and modern life (1960–1969)
 Fritz B. Simon tells this story in his book Meine Psychose, mein Fahrrad und ich - Zur Selbstorganisation der Verrücktheit (1990), a basic introductory and instructional text on modern systems theory and radical constructionism.
 Richard Wiseman used a variation of the story in his book The Luck Factor (2003), to describe the difference in the processing of misfortune and strokes of fate in 'lucky devils' and 'unlucky fellows'.
 Coral Chen wrote and illustrated the children's book The Old Man Who Lost His Horse (2011) in English and Chinese.
 Mascha Kaléko used this subject in the poem Chinesische Legende (1983).
 Charlie Wilson's War (film) features the story during  the celebration of news of Russia leaving Afghanistan, near the end of the film. CIA agent Gus' shares the story as a cautionary tale, while ascribing it to a "zen master".

Literature 
 Charles Le Blanc, Mathieu Rémi: Philosophes taoïstes. Volume 2: Huainan Zi. Gallimard, Paris 2003,  (Bibliothèque de la Pléiade. 494).
 Claude Larre, Isabelle Robinet, Elisabeth Rochet de la Vallée: Les grands traités du Huainan zi. du Cerf, Paris 1993,  (Variétés sinologiques. NS 75); translation of chapters 1, 7, 11, 13, 18.

References

External links 
 Original text in the Chinese Text Project
 Wiktionary with English translation
 Video: Donna Quesada's lecture on daoism (The Daoist Farmer) (englisch)
 Video explaining the Chinese saying

Taoist philosophy
Taoist texts
Chinese words and phrases
Chinese proverbs
Parables
Laozi